This is list of members of the National council, the parliament of Slovakia as they were elected in the 2012 parliamentary election.

 Pavol Abrhan	KDH
 Ladislav Andreánsky	SMER - SD
 Michal Bagačka	SMER - SD
 Vladimír Baláž	SMER - SD
 Tibor Bastrnák	MOST - HÍD
 Jaroslav Baška	SMER - SD
 Miroslav Beblavý	SDKÚ - DS
 Juraj Blanár	SMER - SD
 Otto Brixi	SMER - SD
 Július Brocka	KDH
 Dušan Bublavý	SMER - SD
 Jozef Buček	SMER - SD
 Béla Bugár	MOST - HÍD
 Jozef Burian	SMER - SD
 Gabriel Csicsai	MOST - HÍD
 Dušan Čaplovič	SMER - SD
 Miroslav Číž	SMER - SD
 Jaroslav Demian	SMER - SD
 Juraj Droba	SaS
 Daniel Duchoň	SMER - SD
 Mikuláš Dzurinda	SDKÚ - DS
 Árpád Érsek	MOST - HÍD
 Vladimír Faič	SMER - SD
 Martin Fecko	OĽaNO
 Igor Federič	SMER - SD
 Martin Fedor	SDKÚ - DS
 Robert Fico	SMER - SD
 Ján Figeľ	KDH
 Pavol Frešo	SDKÚ - DS
 Martin Fronc	KDH
 Darina Gabániová	SMER - SD
 Dušan Galis	SMER - SD
 Ľubomír Galko	SaS
 Gábor Gál	MOST - HÍD
 Milan Géci	SMER - SD
 Monika Gibalová	KDH
 Tibor Glenda	SMER - SD
 Martin Glváč	SMER - SD
 Pavol Goga	SMER - SD
 Lea Grečková	SMER - SD
 Augustín Hambálek	SMER - SD
 Alojz Hlina	OĽaNO
 Eva Horváthová	OĽaNO
 Igor Hraško	OĽaNO
 Andrej Hrnčiar	MOST - HÍD
 Pavol Hrušovský	KDH
 Mikuláš Huba	OĽaNO
 Ján Hudacký	KDH
 Rudolf Chmel	MOST - HÍD
 Igor Choma	SMER - SD
 Martin Chren	SaS
 Ľubomír Jahnátek	SMER - SD
 Elemér Jakab	MOST - HÍD
 Mária Janíková	SMER - SD
 Dušan Jarjabek	SMER - SD
 Viliam Jasaň	SMER - SD
 Vladimír Jánoš	SMER - SD
 Erika Jurinová	OĽaNO
 Miroslav Kadúc	OĽaNO
 Robert Kaliňák	SMER - SD
 Ladislav Kamenický	SMER - SD
 Ľudovít Kaník	SDKÚ - DS
 Peter Kažimír	SMER - SD
 Marián Kéry	SMER - SD
 Andrej Kolesík	SMER - SD
 Jozef Kollár	SaS
 Maroš Kondrót	SMER - SD
 Magda Košútová	SMER - SD
 Marián Kovačócy	SMER - SD
 Daniel Krajcer	SaS
 Mikuláš Krajkovič	SMER - SD
 Stanislav Kubánek	SMER - SD
 Štefan Kuffa	OĽaNO
 Marián Kvasnička	KDH
 Jana Laššáková	SMER - SD
 Tibor Lebocký	SMER - SD
 Daniel Lipšic	KDH
 Iveta Lišková	SMER - SD
 Michal Lukša	SMER - SD
 Róbert Madej	SMER - SD
 Marek Maďarič	SMER - SD
 Mojmír Mamojka	SMER - SD
 Ľuboš Martinák	SMER - SD
 Anton Martvoň	SMER - SD
 Vladimír Matejička	SMER - SD
 Igor Matovič	OĽaNO
 Helena Mezenská	OĽaNO
 Ján Mičovský	OĽaNO
 Jozef Mihál	SaS
 Ivan Mikloš	SDKÚ - DS
 Jozef Mikloško	KDH
 Jozef Mikuš	SDKÚ - DS
 Juraj Miškov	SaS
 Milan Mojš	SMER - SD
 Dušan Muňko	SMER - SD
 Peter Muránsky	KDH
 Emília Müllerová	SMER - SD
 József Nagy	MOST - HÍD
 Oľga Nachtmannová	SMER - SD
 Lucia Nicholsonová	SaS
 Viliam Novotný	SDKÚ - DS
 Bibiána Obrimčáková	SMER - SD
 Branislav Ondruš	SMER - SD
 Peter Osuský	SaS
 Milan Panáček	SMER - SD
 Pavol Paška	SMER - SD
 Pavol Pavlis	SMER - SD
 Svetlana Pavlovičová	SMER - SD
 Peter Pellegrini	SMER - SD
 Ľubomír Petrák SMER - SD
 Ján Počiatek	SMER - SD
 Ján Podmanický	SMER - SD
 Martin Poliačik	SaS
 Peter Pollák	OĽaNO
 Radoslav Procházka	KDH
 Alojz Přidal	KDH
 Róbert Puci	SMER - SD
 Richard Raši	SMER - SD
 Ján Richter	SMER - SD
 Mária Ritomská	OĽaNO
 Ľubica Rošková	SMER - SD
 Marián Saloň	SMER - SD
 Ján Senko	SMER - SD
 Zsolt Simon	MOST - HÍD
 László Sólymos	MOST - HÍD
 Ľuboš Blaha	SMER - SD
 Richard Sulík	SaS
 Boris Susko	SMER - SD
 František Šebej	MOST - HÍD
 Branislav Škripek	OĽaNO
 Ivan Štefanec	SDKÚ - DS
 Peter Šuca	SMER - SD
 Ivan Švejna	MOST - HÍD
 Viera Tomanová	SMER - SD
 Ivan Uhliarik	KDH
 Jozef Valocký	SMER - SD
 Jana Vaľová	SMER - SD
 Ivan Varga	SMER - SD
 Richard Vašečka	OĽaNO
 Magdaléna Vášáryová	SDKÚ - DS
 Ľubomír Vážny	SMER - SD
 Jozef Viskupič	OĽaNO
 Anna Vitteková	SMER - SD
 Pavol Zajac	KDH
 Marián Záhumenský	SMER - SD
 Renáta Zmajkovičová	SMER - SD
 Ľubomír Želiezka	SMER - SD
 Peter Žiga	SMER - SD
 Jana Žitňanská	KDH
 Lucia Žitňanská	SDKÚ - DS

References 

(in Slovak) Elected members of National Council

2012